Beddomeia zeehanensis is a species of very small freshwater snail that has a gill and an operculum, an aquatic operculate gastropod mollusk in the family Hydrobiidae. The species was first described in 1993 by Winston Ponder and G.A. Clark.

The species is endemic to Tasmania.

See also
List of non-marine molluscs of Australia

References

External links

 Freshwater Molluscs of Australia. Revision 1A: Beddomeia zeehanensis (description)

Gastropods of Australia
Hydrobiidae
Beddomeia
Vulnerable fauna of Australia
Endemic fauna of Australia
Gastropods described in 1993
Taxonomy articles created by Polbot
Taxa named by Winston Ponder